The  International League season began on Thursday, April 9, with all fourteen teams competing on opening day.  The regular season ended on Monday, September 7.

In the semifinal playoff rounds, the Scranton/Wilkes-Barre Yankees defeated the Gwinnett Braves 3-1 and the Durham Bulls defeated the Louisville Bats 3-2. The Bulls swept the Yankees 3-0 in the championship series to win the Governors' Cup.

Teams

Before the Season

Affiliation changes
Before the 2009 season, three IL teams signed player development contracts (PDC) with different parent clubs.

The Columbus Clippers signed a four-year PDC with the Cleveland Indians through 2012 on September 18, 2008.  The Clippers had previously been affiliated with the Washington Nationals for two years after ending their 28-year partnership with the New York Yankees.  The Indians become the Clippers' third affiliate in four years.

The Syracuse Chiefs signed a two-year PDC with the Washington Nationals through 2010 on September 20, 2008.  The Chiefs had previously been affiliated with the Toronto Blue Jays since 1978 and had been the only Triple-A affiliate in Toronto's history.

The Buffalo Bisons signed a two-year PDC with the New York Mets through 2010 on September 21, 2008.  The Bisons had previously been affiliated with the Cleveland Indians for 14 seasons, winning three league championships (2 in the IL, 1 in the AA).  The Bisons adopted a new logo and the Mets' team colors as their own to reflect the new partnership.

Team changes
After 43 seasons and 5 Governor's Cup championships, the Richmond Braves moved to Lawrenceville, Georgia becoming the Gwinnett Braves.  One factor in the franchise's decision to relocate was reportedly a failure to reach an agreement on building a new ballpark in Richmond.

New stadiums
The Columbus Clippers moved from Cooper Stadium to Huntington Park in Columbus' Arena District.  The stadium, which cost $56 million and will seat 10,000, opened on April 18 as the Clippers hosted their rival Toledo Mud Hens.  Columbus-based bank holding company Huntington Bancshares Inc. bought the stadium's naming rights $12 million over 23 years.

The newly relocated Gwinnett Braves (formerly Richmond Braves) moved into Gwinnett Stadium in Lawrenceville, Georgia, a suburb of Atlanta.  The 10,000 seat stadium is a focal point of a planned mixed-use entertainment district and opened on April 17 as the Braves host the Norfolk Tides.  As of February 2009,
the naming rights to the stadium have not been sold.

Regular season

Opening Day
April 9 is the Opening Day of the 2009 International League season. The following games are scheduled:
Gwinnett Braves @ Charlotte Knights
Rochester Red Wings @ Syracuse Chiefs
Pawtucket Red Sox @ Buffalo Bisons
Toledo Mud Hens @ Indianapolis Indians
Columbus Clippers @ Louisville Bats
Norfolk Tides @ Durham Bulls
Scranton/Wilkes-Barre Yankees @ Lehigh Valley IronPigs

All-star game
The 2009 Triple-A All-Star Game was the 22nd meeting between all-stars of the International and Pacific Coast leagues, with the game taking place on July 17 at PGE Park in Portland, Oregon.  For the twelfth time, the International League would field a team of its best players to compete against the host Pacific Coast League's best players.  The International League would even up the All-Star Game series, with a 6-5 win over the Pacific Coast League all-stars. The PCL held a six games to five lead over the IL before the game.

Standings

y-division champion
x-wild card winner

League leaders

Batting Champions

Pitching Champions

Playoffs
The 2009 International League playoffs will take place at the conclusion of the regular season in September.

References

 
International League seasons